A commercial finance advisor is a professional banker whom businesses contract to consult on business financing and corporate banking relationships.  

Fluent in all manner of commercial finance options available, as well as holding a deep understanding of business cash flow and bank credit assessment processes, the commercial finance advisor can become an invaluable ally of business.  

Commercial finance advisors are not just finance brokers, though this is a small subset of the service that they provide.

See also
 Financial advisor

Banking